Mount Young may refer to:

 Mount Young (Alaska)
 Mount Young (Antarctica)
 Mount Allen Young
 Mount Young (California)
 Mount Young (Falklands)